Cole Escola (born November 25, 1986) is an American comedian, actor, and singer. They are best known for their cabaret work and their appearances on the television series Jeffery & Cole Casserole (2009–2010), Difficult People (2015–2017), At Home with Amy Sedaris (2017–2020), and Search Party (2016–2022).

Early life
Escola was born and raised in Clatskanie, Oregon. They are of Finnish and Norwegian descent. When they were six, their father chased the entire family out of their mobile home with a gun. Escola, their mother, and their brother subsequently lived in government housing. Their sister was not living with them at this time; she was elsewhere. They participated in community theater and starred in high school productions of Fiddler on the Roof, Les Misérables, and Little Shop of Horrors. After graduating from R. A. Long High School in 2005, Escola moved to New York City to study humanities at Marymount Manhattan College, dropping out after one year. They subsequently performed at children's birthday parties and worked at the Scholastic bookstore.

Career

Stage work
From 2008 to 2012, Escola was a perennial guest performer in the Our Hit Parade cabaret series, and later began performing monthly solo shows at the Duplex Cabaret Theatre. They appeared in Scott Wittman's 2012 cabaret show Jukebox Jackie at La MaMa and played an unborn fetus in Bridget Everett's 2014 cabaret show Rock Bottom at Joe's Pub. On June 14, 2017, Escola's hourlong solo show Help! I'm Stuck premiered at Joe's Pub, where it has since played numerous sold-out engagements.

Escola has a collection of 38 wigs, which they store under their bed in 7-Eleven doughnut boxes. Their wigs often shape and inform their recurring stage characters, which include Broadway legend Bernadette Peters, suicidal homemaker Joyce Conner, scheming furniture heiress Jennifer Convertibles, and The Goblin Commuter of Hoboken.

In 2013, Escola played Roland Maule in the Two River Theater revival of Noël Coward's Present Laughter.

Television work
In 2008, Escola met fellow comedian Jeffery Self in New York; bonding over a shared love of theater and 1990s sitcoms, they began creating surreal, semi-scripted YouTube videos under the moniker "Very Good Looking (VGL) Gay Boys." The sketches, in which Escola often played the demented comic foil to Self's straight man, received over 100,000 views, prompting coverage in New York magazine and a development deal from Logo TV. Jeffery & Cole Casserole premiered on Logo on June 19, 2009; it ran for two seasons and has been deemed a "cult classic" by Vice magazine. Escola and Self also wrote the screenplay for an as-yet-unproduced comedy in which two friends "have to go through a lot to redeem their free sandwich."

From 2015 to 2017, Escola played Matthew on the Hulu television series Difficult People, a role that series creator Julie Klausner wrote with them in mind. They have appeared in recurring roles on Mozart in the Jungle, Girlboss, and At Home with Amy Sedaris, in which they play Sedaris' neighbor, Chassie Tucker.

In 2020, Escola appeared as Chip (The Twink) on the HBO Max original Search Party. Chip became a season regular in season 4. Escola voiced The Secret Keeper on the Cartoon Network animated series Craig of the Creek in the episode "Secret in a Bottle".
In 2021 Escola lent their voice to a gargoyle in a season three episode of What We Do in the Shadows (TV series), alongside “Difficult People” co-star Julie Klausner.

Personal life
In 2022, Escola came out as non-binary and now uses they/them pronouns.

Filmography

References

External links
 
Cole Escola on IMDb

1986 births
American gay actors
American gay musicians
American voice actors
Living people
Gay comedians
LGBT people from Oregon
American LGBT singers
People from Clatskanie, Oregon
21st-century American comedians
20th-century LGBT people
21st-century LGBT people
Non-binary comedians
American non-binary actors
American LGBT comedians